The Avro 504 was a First World War biplane aircraft made by the Avro aircraft company and under licence by others. Production during the war totalled 8,970 and continued for almost 20 years, making it the most-produced aircraft of any kind that served in any military capacity during the First World War. More than 10,000 were built from 1913 until production ended in 1932.

Design and development

First flown from Brooklands by Fred "Freddie" Raynham on 18 September 1913, powered by an  Gnome Lambda seven-cylinder rotary engine, the Avro 504 was a development of the earlier Avro 500, designed for training and private flying. It was a two-bay all-wooden biplane with a square-section fuselage.

Manufacturers
The following companies are recorded as manufacturing the Avro 504 under licence.

 A. V. Roe and Co Ltd., Park Works, Newton Heath, Manchester; and at Hamble Aerodrome, near Southampton, Hants
 Australian Aircraft and Engineering, Sydney, NSW, Australia
 Bleriot and SPAD Aircraft Works, Addlestone
 The Brush Electrical Engineering Co Ltd, Loughborough
 Canadian Aeroplanes Ltd, Toronto, Ontario, Canada
 The Eastbourne Aviation Co Ltd, Eastbourne
 Aero Historic, Parana, Argentina
 Fabrica Militar de Aviones, Cordoba, Argentina
 Frederick Sage and Co Ltd, Peterborough and London
 The Grahame-White Aviation Co Ltd, Hendon Aerodrome, London
 Harland and Wolff Ltd, Belfast
 The Henderson Scottish Aviation Factory, Aberdeen
 Hewlett and Blondeau Ltd, Luton
 Humber Limited, Coventry 
 Morgan and Co, Leighton Buzzard
 Nakajima Hikoki Seisaku Sho, Ohta-Machi, Tokyo, Japan
 Parnall & Sons, Bristol
 Regent Carriage, Fulham
 S. E. Saunders Ltd, East Cowes, Isle of Wight 
 Savages Ltd, King's Lynn,
 Societe Anonyme Belge de Constructions Aeronautiques Haren, Brussels, Belgium
 The Sunbeam Motor Car Co Ltd, Wolverhampton
 TNCA, Balbuena field in Mexico City
 Yokosuka Naval Arsenal, Japan

Operational history 

Small numbers of early aircraft were purchased by the Royal Flying Corps (RFC) and the Royal Naval Air Service (RNAS) prior to the start of the First World War, and were taken to France when the war started. One of the RFC aircraft was the first British aircraft to be shot down by the Germans, on 22 August 1914. The pilot was 2nd Lt. Vincent Waterfall and his navigator Lt Charles George Gordon Bayly (both of 5 Sqn RFC) The RNAS used four 504s to form a special flight in order to bomb the Zeppelin works at Friedrichshafen on the shores of Lake Constance. Three set out from Belfort in north-eastern France on 21 November 1914, carrying four  bombs each. While one aircraft was shot down, the raid was successful, with several direct hits on the airship sheds and the destruction of the hydrogen generating plant.

Soon obsolete as a frontline aircraft, it came into its own as a trainer, with thousands being built during the war, with the major production types being the 504J and the mass production 504K, designed with modified engine bearers to accommodate a range of engines in order to cope with engine shortages. 8,340 Avro 504s had been produced by the end of 1918.

In the winter of 1917–18 it was decided to use converted 504Js and 504Ks to equip Home Defence squadrons of the RFC, replacing ageing B.E.2cs, which had poor altitude performance. These aircraft were modified as single-seaters, armed with a Lewis gun above the wing on a Foster mounting, and powered by  Gnome or  Le Rhône engines. 274 converted Avro 504Js and Ks were issued to eight home defence squadrons in 1918, with 226 still being used as fighters at the end of the First World War.

Following the end of the war, while the type continued in service as the standard trainer of the RAF, large numbers of surplus aircraft were available for sale, both for civil and military use. More than 300 504Ks were placed on the civil register in Britain. Used for training, pleasure flying, banner towing and even barnstorming exhibitions (as was ongoing in North America following World War I with the similar-role, surplus Curtiss JN-4s and Standard J-1s); civil 504s continued flying in large numbers until well into the 1930s.

The embryonic air service of the Soviet Union, formed just after the First World War, used both original Avro 504s and their own Avrushka (" Little Avro") copy of it for primary training as the U-1 in the early 1920s, usually powered by Russian-made copies of the Gnome Monosoupape rotary engine.  This Russian version of the 504 was replaced by what would become the most produced biplane in all of aviation history, the Polikarpov Po-2, first known as the U-2; the type remained in Soviet service till the late 1920s, and much later elsewhere.

Although Avro 504s sold to China were training versions, they participated in battles among warlords by acting as bombers with the pilot dropping hand grenades and modified mortar shells .

The improved, redesigned and radial-engined 504N with a new undercarriage was produced by Avro in 1925. After evaluation of two prototypes, one powered by the Bristol Lucifer and the other by the Armstrong-Siddeley Lynx, the Lynx-powered aircraft was selected by the RAF to replace the 504K. 592 were built between 1925 and 1932, equipping the RAF's five flying training schools, while also being used as communication aircraft. The 504N was also exported to the armed forces of Belgium, Brazil, Chile, Denmark, Greece, Siam and South Africa, with licensed production taking place in Denmark, Belgium, Canada, Siam and Japan.

The RAF's 504Ns were finally replaced in 1933 by the Avro Tutor, with small numbers continuing in civilian use until 1940, when seven were impressed into RAF service, where they were used for target- and glider-towing.

The 504 was the first British aeroplane to strafe troops on the ground as well as the first British aircraft to make a bombing raid over Germany. It was also the first Allied aeroplane to be downed by enemy anti-aircraft fire and was the first aircraft flown by many future aces, including Billy Bishop.

The 504 is easily recognisable because of the single skid between the wheels, referred to as the "toothpick" in the RAF.

Variants

504:  Gnome Lambda engine.
Original model
504A:
Modified with smaller ailerons and broader struts.  Gnome engine.
504B
Version for RNAS with larger fin.  Gnome or Le Rhône engine.
504C
Single-seat anti-zeppelin aircraft for the RNAS. The 504C was fitted with an extra fuel tank, in place of the observer.
504D
Single-seat anti-zeppelin aircraft for the Royal Flying Corps. Six built.
504E
 Gnome Monosoupape engine. Ten built.
504F
 Rolls-Royce Hawk engine. One built.
504G
Two-seat weapons training variant of the Type 504B for the RNAS. The Avro 504G was intended as a bombing/gunnery trainer, with provision for a Scarff ring mounted on the upper longerons, though the final ten delivered had no provision for a gun. Fitted with one 80 hp Gnome powerplant. 50 built and delivered between June 1917 and January 1918. 30 built by Avro and 20 constructed by The Regent Carriage Company.
504H
504C modified for catapult trials. 80 hp (60 kW) Gnome engine.
504J
504A modified to mount a  Gnome engine.

504K
Two-seat training aircraft. The 504K had a universal mount to take different engines. Single-seat fighter (Comic) conversion used for anti-zeppelin work. Several were assembled in Australia by Australian Aircraft & Engineering.  Clerget 9B,  Gnome Monosoupape or  Le Rhône 9J engines.

504K Mk.II
Hybrid trainer based on 504K fuselage with 504N undercarriage and wings and powered by rotary engine. Built under licence in Mexico as Avro Anahuac.
504L
Floatplane version.  Bentley BR1,  Clerget or  Le Rhône engines.

504M
Three-seat cabin biplane. Only one was ever built.  Gnome engine.
504N
Two-seat training aircraft. Redesigned postwar trainer for RAF with  Armstrong Siddeley Lynx engine. 598 built.

504O
Floatplane version of 504N. First aircraft to fly above the Arctic Circle in 1923 Oxford Expedition.
504P
Unbuilt version of the 504N with side-by-side seating.
504Q
Three-seat cabin biplane. The 504Q was built for the Oxford University Arctic Expedition. Only one was ever built, powered by an Armstrong Siddeley Lynx engine.
504R Gosport
Reworked trainer with revised, lightweight structure. Five prototypes flown 1926 to 1927 with various engines (100 hp/75 kW Gnome Monosoupape, 100 hp/75 kW) Avro Alpha, (140 hp/104 kW) Armstrong Siddeley Genet Major and (150 hp/110 kW) Armstrong Siddeley Mongoose), with the Mongoose chosen for production aircraft. Ten were sold to Argentina, with 100 more built by FMA under licence in Argentina. Twelve were exported to Estonia, remaining in service until 1940, and an unknown number to Peru.

504S
Two-seat training aircraft. Built under licence in Japan by Nakajima.
540
Observer training version of 504K for Japan.
582
Experimental version of 504N, with new wings of RAF 30 aerofoil section, Frise ailerons on the bottom mainplanes, wing struts reduced to a "K" arrangement and a simplified undercarriage. Converted back to 504N standard in 1928 for Bristol Titan engine test bed.
585
504R modified with 504N undercarriage and  Avro Alpha engine.
598 Warregull
Two-seat trainer based on 504N for Australia, not built.
599 Warregull II
Redesigned version of Type 598, not built.
Yokosuka K2Y1
Japanese version of the Avro 504N, given the long designation Yokosuka Navy Type 3 Primary Trainer, powered by a  Mitsubishi-built Armstrong Siddeley Mongoose radial piston engine, 104 built.

Yokosuka K2Y2
Improved version of the K2Y1, powered by a  Gasuden Jimpu 2 radial piston engine. 360 built (K2Y1 and K2Y2). Watanabe built aircraft were given the long designation Watanabe Navy Type 3-2 Land-based Primary Trainer.
U-1 (Uchebnyi - 1) Avrushka
Russian copy of the 504K. Over 700 built.
MU-1 (Morskoy Uchebnyi - 1)
Russian seaplane version.
Orlogsværftet Flyvemaskineværksted LB.I - Danish production at the Royal Naval Dockyard (Orlogsværftet)

Operators

Argentine Army Aviation Service - purchased 10 directly from Avro, with a further 34 license-built by FMA from 1928 to 1937. In service until 1938.

Australian Flying Corps
No. 5 (Training) Squadron in the United Kingdom
No. 6 (Training) Squadron in the United Kingdom
No. 7 (Training) Squadron in the United Kingdom
No. 8 (Training) Squadron in the United Kingdom
Central Flying School AFC at Point Cook, Victoria
Royal Australian Air Force
No. 1 Flying Training School RAAF at Point Cook
Western Australian Airways
Qantas (Queensland And Northern Territory Aerial Service)

Belgian Air Force purchased 50 British-built 504Ks from 1920 to 1922, with a further 27 being built under license by SABCA These were replaced by the 504N, 17 being built by Avro in 1929–31, and 31 being built under license.

Bolivian Air Force 11 Avro 504R Gosport

Brazilian Air Force
Brazilian Naval Aviation

Royal Canadian Air Force

Chilean Air Force
Chilean Navy

Republic of China Air Force
 China-Nanjing
 Reorganized Republic of China Air Force operated at least one in the trainer role.

Royal Danish Air Force
Royal Danish Navy

Estonian Air Force

Finnish Air Force

Hellenic Air Force
Hellenic Navy

Guatemalan Air Force

 British India

Imperial Iranian Air Force

Irish Air Service
Irish Air Corps

Imperial Japanese Navy Air Service

Latvian Air Force
Aizsargi

Mexican Air Force
Models made in Mexico were called "Avro Anáhuac"

Mongolian People's Army Air Corps

Dutch Army Aviation Group -
Royal Netherlands East Indies Army Air Force

New Zealand Permanent Air Force

Norwegian Army Air Service

Peruvian Air Force

Polish Air Force - 1 Avro 504K (captured from the Soviets in 1920).

Portuguese Air Force
Portuguese Navy

 Imperial Russian Air Service

South African Air Force

 Soviet Air Force - With original British-built examples, and Soviet built U-1 Avrushka copy.
 Kingdom of Spain
Spanish Navy
Spanish Republican Navy

Swedish Air Force
Swedish Navy

Swiss Air Force
 (Thailand)
Royal Siamese Air Force - 40 Avro 504N (at least).
Royal Thai Navy

Turkish Air Force - Two aircraft

Royal Flying Corps
Royal Air Force
Royal Naval Air Service

American Expeditionary Force
United States Army Air Service

Uruguayan Air Force

Surviving aircraft and replicas
Australia

 A3-4 – 504K on static display at the Australian War Memorial in Campbell, Australian Capital Territory. It was initially given the serial number H2174 before being sent to Australia in 1918–19. It was donated to the memorial in August 1929. It was loaned to Qantas in 1965 and restored to resemble the first Qantas aircraft. It was restored to original condition and returned to the Australian War Memorial in 1987.
 Replica – 504K on static display at the Qantas Founders Outback Museum in Longreach, Queensland. Built in 1988, it is marked as G-AUBG and represents the first Qantas Avro 504K.
 Replica – 504K on static display at the Sydney Airport in Sydney, New South Wales. Built in 1988, it is marked as G-AUBG and represents the first Qantas Avro 504K.
 Replica – 504K on static display at the RAAF Museum in Point Cook, Victoria. It uses an original engine, fittings, and instruments and is marked as E3747.

Canada
 H2453 – 504K on static display at the Canada Aviation and Space Museum in Ottawa, Ontario. It was previously registered as G-CYFG and before that owned by Cole Palen.
 Replica – 504K on static display at the Base Borden Military Museum at CFB Borden near Angus, Ontario. It is on loan from the Canada Aviation and Space Museum, was previously registered as G-CYCK, and before that was owned by J.S. Appleby.

Finland
 AV-57 – 504K in storage at the Finnish Airforce Museum in Tikkakoski, Jyväskylä.

New Zealand
 A202 – 504K airworthy at The Vintage Aviator in Masterton, Wellington. It was purchased by the New Zealand Permanent Air Force in 1925, and subsequently operated as a civilian aircraft.

Norway
 Unknown – 504K on static display at the Norwegian Aviation Museum in Bodø, Nordland. It was in service from July 1921 to 1928 and has been on display at the museum since 1995. It is painted with the registration number 103, which belonged to 504A that crashed in 1919.

Russia
 Replica – 504K airworthy in Russia. It was previously on display at the Military Aviation Museum in Virginia Beach, Virginia. It has been given the serial number "H5991" and is painted in Royal Flying Corps colors.

United Kingdom
 BK892 – 504K airworthy at the Shuttleworth Collection in Old Warden, Bedfordshire. It was originally given the serial number H5199, but was converted to a 504N and sold into civilian ownership. However, it was later impressed into RAF service during World War II as a glider tug, at which point it was given a new serial number. Again returned to civilian use after the war, it was used in the filming of Reach for the Sky.
 D7560 – 504K on static display at the Science Museum in London.
 H2311 – 504K on static display at the Museum of Science and Industry in Manchester.
 Composite – 504K on static display at the Royal Air Force Museum London in London. It is made up of the fuselage of G-EBJE and the wings of G-EBKN.
 Replica – 504K on static display at the Brooklands Museum in Weybridge, Surrey. Marked as G-AACA, it was originally built as a taxiable replica for the 1970s BBC TV series 'Wings'; later acquired by the RAF Museum, Hendon and stored at RAF Henlow then loaned to Brooklands Museum c.1987. Later donated to Brooklands Museum, fitted with an original rotary engine and restored to represent one of two 504s used by the Brooklands School of Flying in the late 1920s and early 1930s. 
 Replica – 504J on static display at Solent Sky in Southampton, Hampshire. It is marked as C4451 and was built by ADJ, BAPC No 210.
Replica-504K built by Pursang in Argentina in 2010, bought by Eric Vernon-Roe, grandson of Alliot Vernon-Roe, founder of Avro, and then to the UK. Registered as G-EROE, it displays with the Great War Display Team.

United States
 A201 – 504 under restoration at Blue Swallow Aircraft in Earlysville, Virginia.
 Replica – 504 under construction at Blue Swallow Aircraft in Earlysville, Virginia
 Replica – 504K undergoing work to airworthy at the Old Rhinebeck Aerodrome in Red Hook, New York. It has been flying since 1971.
 Replica – 504K on static display at the National Museum of the United States Air Force in Dayton, Ohio. It was built in 1966-1967 by the Royal Canadian Air Force's Aircraft Maintenance & Development Unit and arrived at the museum in May 2003. It was previously registered as G-CYEI.

Specifications (Avro 504K)

Notable appearances in media

See also
 German language page on the Soviet-produced U-1 Avrushka
 Sempill Mission

Footnotes

Notes

Bibliography

External links

Argentine AVRO 504 (Spanish)
Avro 504 site
RAF Museum Hendon/London
Biplanes.de German language page with Old Rhinebeck Aerodrome's Avro 504 reproduction
Biplanes.de German language page with assembly photos of ORA's Avro 504 reproduction
YouTube Video of Old Rhinebeck's Avro 504 reproduction in flight
Avro 504 in Greek service
Old Rhinebeck Aerodrome's Avro 504 page

1910s British bomber aircraft
1910s British military reconnaissance aircraft
1910s British military trainer aircraft
Military aircraft of World War I
504
Biplanes
Single-engined tractor aircraft
Aircraft first flown in 1913
Rotary-engined aircraft